Beers (Brabants: Bèèrs) is a village in the former Dutch municipality of Cuijk. It is located about 4 km west of Cuijk. Since 2022 it has been part of the new municipality of Land van Cuijk.

Beers has a population of about 1721: 1305 in the village itself, and 416 in the surrounding countryside, including the hamlets De Plaats and Dommelsvoort.

Until 1994, Beers was a separate municipality.

Toponymy
The name Beers might come from bere or baren, which can mean mud or stuff in Dutch.

History
Beers is first noted in a document that was written between 1050 and 1200. In it beers was named Berse. The family Van Beerse was a vassal from the Lord of Cuijk, making Beers belong to the municipality of Cuijk. This vassal however, did own a small castle surrounded by a moat, named De Broekhof.

Around 1814, at the end of the French age and at the beginning of the Kingdom of the Netherlands, Beers became a separate municipality. In 1942, Great-Linden and Gassel joined Beers. In 1994 the municipality of Beers was repealed. Gassel joined the municipality of Grave, North Brabant, while Beers and Great-Linden (today Linden, North Brabant) joined Cuijk.

Gallery

References

Municipalities of the Netherlands disestablished in 1994
Former municipalities of North Brabant
Populated places in North Brabant
Geography of Land van Cuijk